The men's 10,000 metres walk event at the 2008 World Junior Championships in Athletics was held in Bydgoszcz, Poland, at Zawisza Stadium on 11 July.

Medalists

Results

Final
11 July

Participation
According to an unofficial count, 35 athletes from 24 countries participated in the event.

References

10,000 metres walk
Racewalking at the World Athletics U20 Championships